is a railway station  in the city of Yonezawa, Yamagata Prefecture, Japan, operated by East Japan Railway Company (JR East).

Lines
Sekine Station is served by the Ōu Main Line, and is located 34.8 rail kilometers from the terminus of the line at Fukushima Station.

Station layout
The station has two opposed side platforms connected via a level crossing. The station is unattended.

Platforms

History
Sekine Station opened on 15 May 1899. The station was absorbed into the JR East network upon the privatization of JNR on 1 April 1987.

Surrounding area

See also
List of Railway Stations in Japan

External links

 JR East Station information 

Stations of East Japan Railway Company
Railway stations in Yamagata Prefecture
Ōu Main Line
Railway stations in Japan opened in 1899
Yonezawa, Yamagata